Hale Township is located in Warren County, Illinois, United States. As of the 2010 census, its population was 344 and it contained 136 housing units.

Geography

Demographics

References

External links
City-data.com
Illinois State Archives

Townships in Warren County, Illinois
Galesburg, Illinois micropolitan area
Townships in Illinois